Astrée may refer to:
 L'Astrée, a novel by Honoré d'Urfé or its main character
 Astrée run-time error analyzer, a tool for static program analysis
 Astrée (record label), a record label founded by Michel Bernstein
 Astrée (Collasse), an opera by Pascal Collasse
 Astrée (Typeface), a Deberny & Peignot typeface
 French ship Astrée, a number of ships of the French Navy

See also
Astraea (disambiguation)
Astrea (disambiguation)